Icking is a municipality  in the district of Bad Tölz-Wolfratshausen in Bavaria in Germany.

People
 Anita Augspurg, lived in Icking from 1916 until she fled the Nazis
 Dieter Borsche, actor, lived in Icking in the beginning of the '60s.
 Bernhard Buttersack, painter, died in 1925 in Icking.
 Karl Wilhelm Diefenbach, painter.
 Klaus Doldinger, jazz musician.
 O. W. Fischer, Austrian actor, lived in Irschenhausen in the '60s.
 Gert Fröbe, actor, buried in Icking in 1988.
 Max W. Kimmich, scriptwriter, lived in Icking until he died.
 D. H. Lawrence, English writer, lived in Icking in September 1927.
 Golo Mann, author and philosopher.
 Erich von Manstein, Generalfeldmarschall, died in 1973 in Icking.
 Leo Geyr von Schweppenburg died in 1974 in Irschenhausen.
 Moritz Barth Raubritter aus Icking, 15. Jahrhundert. Starb 1463 in Unterjesingen

Geography

Townships
It consists of:
Attenhausen
Dorfen
Holzen
Icking
Irschenhausen
Meilenberg
Obere Alpe
Schützenried
Schlederloh
Spatzenloh
Wadlhausen
Walchstadt

History
The region belonged to the bursary of Munich and the district court of Wolfratshausen in the electorate of Bavaria and was a lordship of Schäftlarn until its secularization. In 1818, Icking became an autonomous political community following Bavaria's administrative reform.

Public facilities

Educational institutions
The Rainer-Maria-Rilke Gymnasium Icking was founded in 1921 through a parent initiative. On 23 August 1960, a contract was signed, making it a state institution. Today the school features three educational paths, focusing on humanities and the classics, the sciences, and modern languages. Current enrollment is around 900 students.

Transport

Icking station was opened on 27 July 1891 with this section of the Isar Valley Railway and is served at 20-minute intervals by line S 7 of the Munich S-Bahn between Wolfratshausen and Kreuzstrasse.

Recreational facilities
Beach volleyball complex, Ski jump (out of commission), tennis courts, soccer field, gymnasiums at the elementary school and Gymnasium.

References

External links 
 Official website

Bad Tölz-Wolfratshausen